East Second Street District may refer to:

East Second Street Historic District (Dayton, Ohio), a National Register of Historic Places listing in Montgomery County, Ohio
East Second Street Historic District (Xenia, Ohio)

See also
East Second Street Commercial Historic District (disambiguation)